Echinoderes aspinosus is a species of mud dragons first found in coastal and subtidal locations around the Korean Peninsula and in the East China Sea.

References

External links

Kinorhyncha
Animals described in 2012